Gabriela Sánchez, (born June 1, 1987 in Guadalajara, Mexico) better known as "Gaby", is a Mexican singer. She was a contestant on the Mexican reality show, Buscando a Timbiriche, La Nueva Banda. Gaby entered the reality show even though her father was completely against it and did not support her until later on. She was later named as the fourth member to the band, alongside six other contestants. During the reality show she dated Alberto who was named the third member. As a contestant she was the first to obtain a perfect score. Gaby was the eldest female of the group and the second eldest in general. She was once a flag girl for a popular Mexican soccer team. Gaby sang the introductory song of the Telenovela Cuidado con el Angel (Beware of the Angel) a popular song called ( Solo TU ) which was then officially the 3rd Single of La Nueva Banda, becoming one of their most successful singles. La Nueva Banda Timbiriche split in 2009 and Gaby began working as a solo artist. In summer 2011, Gaby began  recording her first solo album in Los Angeles.

External links 
  
 The Contestants of Buscando A Timbiriche, La Nueva Banda
 

Timbiriche members
Buscando a Timbiriche, La Nueva Banda contestants
Mexican women singers
Singers from Guadalajara, Jalisco
Living people
1987 births